Arthur Bloomfeld was a German sailor who competed in the 1900 Summer Olympics.

He was the crew on the German boat Aschenbrödel. Arthur Bloomfeld participated in the ½–1 ton class, but the boat Aschenbrödel weighed in at 1.041 tons instead of less than 1 ton, and was disqualified.

Further reading

References

German male sailors (sport)
Olympic sailors of Germany
Sailors at the 1900 Summer Olympics – .5 to 1 ton
Year of birth missing
Year of death missing
Place of birth missing
Place of death missing